National Route 53 is a national highway of Japan connecting Okayama, Okayama and Tottori, Tottori.

Route data
Length: 138.5 km (86.06 mi).

References

053
Roads in Okayama Prefecture
Roads in Tottori Prefecture